Costertonia is a mesophilic genus of bacteria from the family of Flavobacteriaceae with one known species (Costertonia aggregata). The genus Costertonia is named after the American microbiologist J.W. Costerton.

References

Flavobacteria
Monotypic bacteria genera
Bacteria genera